The commemorative coins of Lithuania are minted by the Lithuanian mint (Lithuanian: Lietuvos monetų kalykla), headquartered in Vilnius, Lithuania.

Commemorative coins issued 1993–2014

Commemorative circulation coins issued 1997–2013

References
 
 

Coins of Lithuania
Lithuania